Limoniastrum is a genus of plants in the family Plumbaginaceae, containing two known species of subshrubs found the Mediterranean region, within Africa and southern Europe.

It was published by Fabricius in 1759 in 'Enum. Meth. Pl. Hort. Helmstad' Vol.25.

List of species
 Limoniastrum guyonianum Boiss.
 Limoniastrum monopetalum (L.) Boiss. - (grand statice)

References

Plumbaginaceae
Caryophyllales genera